The Chile women's national volleyball team is the national team of Chile. 

Chile has played a one World Championship competition, in 1982 in Peru, where it was eliminated in the Main Round. This team played in the Group D with Soviet Union and Australia, while the match against U-20 Peru team did not count in the championship.

References

External links
Official website

National women's volleyball teams
Volleyball
Volleyball in Chile